The Best of 10 Years – 32 Superhits also known as 32 Superhits - Non-Stop Digital Remix is a remix album by Boney M. released in 1986.

In 1981 producer Frank Farian created a thirteen-minute medley in the style of Stars on 45 called "6 Years of Boney M. Hits (Boney M. on 45)" which was issued as both A- and B-side singles in certain territories - in the UK the medley was the B-side of Boonoonoonoos 12" single "We Kill The World (Don't Kill The World)", in Germany the edited 7" version appeared as the B-side of Christmas Album single "Little Drummer Boy" and the longer version as a separate A-side 12" release in early 1982.

Five years later, shortly after the unsuccessful Eye Dance project, when Boney M. were celebrating their first decade as a group - although it in reality was dissolved at the time - Farian took the non-stop medley idea one step further and extended the medley to a thirty-two track, forty-six minutes full-length album of Boney M's greatest hits with additional percussive and synthesized overdubs.

The Best of 10 Years - 32 Superhits reached #3 on the German albums chart.

In the Mix
In 2008, Sony-BMG re-issued the album with a new cover and title as "In the Mix".

Track listing

Side A
"Daddy Cool" (Farian, Reyam) - 1:43
"Sunny" (Bobby Hebb) - 1:37
 "Ma Baker" (Farian, Jay, Reyam) - 1:53
 "Belfast" (Hillsbury, Deutscher, Menke) - 1:13
"Rasputin" (Farian, Jay, Reyam) - 1:34
"Painter Man" (Phillips, Pickett) - 1:40
"Children of Paradise" (Farian, Jay, Reyam) - 1:36
"Gotta Go Home" (Farian, Jay, Klinkhammer) - 1:45
"Dreadlock Holiday"  (Graham Gouldman, Eric Stewart) - 1:22
"Felicidad (Margherita)" (Conz, Massara) - 1:40
"Barbarella Fortuneteller" (Davis, Farian, Kawohl) - 1:40
"Gadda-Da-Vida" (Doug Ingle) - 1:43
"Got Cha Loco"  (Applegate, Baierl, Farian, Reyam) - 1:25
"Todos Buenos"  (Applegate, Farian) - 1:50

Side B
"No Woman, No Cry" (Ford, Bob Marley) - 1:42
"Brown Girl in the Ring" (Farian) - 1:41
"B.M. à GoGo" - 5:52 (Arr. Farian)
"New York City"
"Gloria Can You Waddle"
"Baby Do You Wanna Bump"
"He Was a Steppenwolf"
"Bye Bye Bluebird"
"Nightflight to Venus"
"Rivers of Babylon" (Farian, Reyam) - 1:45
"El Lute" (Farian, Jay, Klinkhammer, Kolonovits) - 1:43
"The Calendar Song (January, February, March...)" (Farian) - 1:50
"Bang Bang Lulu"  (Farian) - 1:32
"Hooray! Hooray! It's a Holi-Holiday" (Farian) - 0:59
"Kalimba De Luna"  (Davis, Farian, Kawohl) - 1:38
"My Cherie Amour" (Cosby, Moy, Stevie Wonder) - 1:32
"I Feel Good" (Bischof, Farian) - 1:21
"Young, Free and Single" (Applegate, Farian, Reyam) - 1:42
"Happy Song" (Abacab, Bacciocchi, Spagna) - 1:48

Personnel
 Liz Mitchell - lead vocals, backing vocals
 Marcia Barrett - lead vocal "Belfast", backing vocals
 Frank Farian - lead vocals, backing vocals
 Reggie Tsiboe - lead vocals, backing vocals
 Bobby Farrell - vocals (rap) on track Happy Song and vocoder (vocals) on Young,free & Single

Production
 Frank Farian - producer

Charts

Release history
 1986 Germany: CD Hansa 610 550-222
 1986 Germany: LP Hansa 207 500-501
 1986 UK: Stylus SMR 621

As "In the Mix"
 2008 EU: Sony-BMG 88697-39671-2

Single releases
Germany
7"
 "Daddy Cool (Anniversary Recording '86)" -  5:18 / "B.M.A.G.O." - 4:10 (Hansa Records 107 994-100, 1986)

12"
 "Daddy Cool (Anniversary Recording '86)" Special Club Mix - 7:45 / Special Club Dub - 6:43 / "B.M.A.G.O." - 3:00 Hansa 607 994-213, 1986)

References

Sources and external links
 Rate Your Music, detailed discography
 Discogs.com, detailed discography
 [ Allmusic, biography, discography etc.]

Albums produced by Frank Farian
1986 remix albums
1986 greatest hits albums
Boney M. compilation albums
Boney M. remix albums
Hansa Records compilation albums